Dragoș Grigore (born 7 September 1986) is a Romanian professional footballer who plays as a centre-back for Liga I club Rapid București.

Personal life
Grigore is known for charity work in Romania.

Career statistics

Club 
As of match played 11 March 2023

International

International goals

Honours
Dinamo București
Cupa României: 2011–12
Supercupa României: 2012

Ludogorets Razgrad
Bulgarian First League: 2018–19, 2019–20, 2020–21
Bulgarian Supercup: 2019

References

External links

1986 births
Living people
Sportspeople from Vaslui
Romanian footballers
Association football defenders
Liga I players
Liga II players
Liga III players
FC CFR Timișoara players
FC Dinamo București players
FC Rapid București players
Ligue 1 players
Toulouse FC players
Qatar Stars League players
Al-Sailiya SC players
First Professional Football League (Bulgaria) players
PFC Ludogorets Razgrad players
Romanian expatriate footballers
Expatriate footballers in France
Romanian expatriate sportspeople in France
Expatriate footballers in Qatar
Romanian expatriate sportspeople in Qatar
Expatriate footballers in Bulgaria
Romanian expatriate sportspeople in Bulgaria
Romania international footballers
UEFA Euro 2016 players